The Liberal Party (V) is a centrist political party in Norway. It was founded in 1884 and it is the oldest political party in Norway. It is positioned in the centre on the political spectrum, and it is a liberal party which has over the time enacted reforms such as parliamentarism, freedom of religion, universal suffrage, and state schooling.

For most of the late 19th and early 20th century, it was Norway's largest and dominant political party, but in the postwar era it lost most of its support and became a relatively small party. The party has nevertheless participated in several centrist and centre-right government coalitions in the postwar era. It currently holds eight seats in the Parliament, and was previously a part of Norway's government together with the Conservative Party and the Christian Democratic Party. Guri Melby has served as the party leader since 2020.

Founded in 1884, then with the main support from farmers and progressive members of the bourgeoisie, it was the first political party that came into existence in Norway, and was the dominant government party for several decades. From the beginning it had a close relationship with the Norwegian Association for Women's Rights, which was founded in the same year by most of the Liberal Party's leading politicians, and the party played a central role in advocating for women's suffrage. Since the 1880s, the party has seen many internal schisms. A politically moderate and religious wing broke out in 1888 to form the Moderate Liberal Party, and the conservative-liberal faction, including among them the first Prime Minister of Norway Christian Michelsen broke out in 1909 to form the Free-minded Liberal Party (both parties eventually merged into the Conservative Party). The most notable recent schism was in 1972, when the Liberal Party decided to oppose Norwegian membership in the European Economic Community (EEC), and the faction supporting membership broke out and formed the Liberal People's Party.

History 

The party Venstre was formed in 1884 in connection with the dispute about whether or not to introduce parliamentarism in Norway. Venstre (which means "Left" in Norwegian) was the party advocating parliamentarism, whereas the conservatives, who opposed parliamentarism, formed the party Høyre (which means "Right"). When the fight for parliamentarism was won, Venstre's leader Johan Sverdrup became the first Norwegian prime minister to be appointed on the basis of having the support of a majority in the Storting. Later, Venstre advocated universal suffrage for men, which was achieved in 1898, the break-up of the Swedish-Norwegian Union, which happened in 1905, and universal women's suffrage, which was introduced in 1913. In the first decades after 1884, Venstre formed several governments, interspersed with periods of Høyre-governments. Six different Prime Ministers of Norway have come from Venstre, all of them before 1935. With the growth of the Labour Party, Venstre gradually lost ground. The election of 1915 was the last in which Venstre was the largest party and won an outright majority in the Storting. Venstre was further weakened with the formation of Bondepartiet (the present day Centre Party) in 1920, and Christian People's Party in 1933, both of which were formed partly by former Venstre members. After World War II, Venstre has been part of five coalition governments, the most recent one being Solberg's Cabinet from 2018.

A dispute over Norwegian membership in the European Community, now the European Union, made the party split up at Røros in 1972, with the people favoring EC membership departing, and forming the Liberal People's Party. These included the party leader, Helge Seip, and 9 of the 13 members of parliament. Since then, Venstre has been a fairly small party. The parliamentary group was reduced to two after the 1973 election.

In 1974, Venstre elected the first female leader of a political party in Norway, Eva Kolstad.

Election results continued to be poor for Venstre. Before the 1985 elections, the party announced for the first, and so far only, time that they would support a Labour Party government. At the following election they lost their two remaining seats, and were without representation in the Norwegian Parliament for the first time. In 1988, Venstre was re-united with the splinter party from 1972, now calling itself the Liberal People's Party, but at the elections of 1989, the re-united party again failed to win parliamentary seats. In 1993 the party again failed to achieve the 4% threshold which would make them eligible for the leveling seats in parliament, but Lars Sponheim was elected directly from Hordaland county. (Before the election, Sponheim had made the wager that he would walk across the mountains from his home in Ulvik to the parliament in capital city Oslo if elected—a wager he delivered on, to much good-humoured interest from the press.)

In 1997, Venstre passed the 4% threshold, increasing their seats in parliament to six. As a consequence Venstre also saw their first participation in cabinet since 1973. The party held four seats in the minority first government of Kjell Magne Bondevik. Lars Sponheim became minister of industry and commerce, Odd Einar Dørum; minister of communications, later minister of justice, Guro Fjellanger; minister of environmental protection, and Eldbjørg Løwer; minister of administration, later minister of defense. Mrs. Løwer was the first female minister of defense in Norway. This cabinet resigned in 2000, refusing to accept the Storting's decision to build gas power plants. In 2001, Venstre narrowly failed to reach the 4% threshold, but got two representatives elected, Sponheim and Odd Einar Dørum. However, due to Venstre becoming part of the second coalition government of Kjell Magne Bondevik, with Sponheim and Dørum entering the cabinet, the two were represented in parliament by deputies. The party also got a third member of the cabinet, with the appointment of Torild Skogsholm as Minister of Transport and Communications.

The 2005 elections gave Venstre 5.9% of the vote, their best result since the 1969 elections. Venstre won 6 seats directly, and an additional 4 seats through the 4%+ compensatory system. Due to the majority of the Red-Green Coalition, Venstre became an opposition party.

In the 2009 general elections. Venstre ended up below the 4% threshold for levelling seats, leaving the party with only two seats in parliament, Trine Skei Grande and Borghild Tenden, whereas they had ten seats before the election. The same evening, 14 September 2009, Lars Sponheim announced that he would step down as party leader, as a consequence of the poor result. After the election, the party experienced growth in members. At the party conference in April 2010, Trine Skei Grande was unanimously elected as the new leader of the party.

Venstre climbed over the threshold with 5.2% in the 2013 elections and entered into coalition talks with the Conservative, Christian Democratic, and Progress parties. Venstre and the Christian Democrats decided not to enter the new Solberg Cabinet, thus leaving it without a parliamentary majority, but made a confidence and supply agreement with it.

Winning 8 seats in the 2017 elections, Venstre entered into new talks with the Conservative and Progress Party coalition, and joined the coalition in January 2018 with three cabinet posts; Ola Elvestuen became Minister of Climate and Environment, Iselin Nybø Minister of Research and Higher Education, while party leader Trine Skei Grande became Minister of Culture.

Ideology

The party is regarded as liberal, social-liberal, classical liberal and centrist. The party advocates personal freedom under the pre-condition of an active state. Since the 1970s, the party has maintained a green liberal position, which was an important part of the party profile when it came back to parliament in the 1990s. The Liberal Party was rated the second best party after the Green Party by the environmentalist organisation Framtiden i våre hender. The party is also a strong supporter of multiculturalism, increased labour immigration to Norway, and relaxed integration measures.

Through its history, it has taken part in both centre-right and pure centrist coalition governments. From 2001 to 2005, it was in a centre-right coalition government with the Conservative Party and Christian Democratic Party; since the 2005 general election, the party has been in opposition. More recently the party has been a proponent of a blue–green alliance in Norwegian politics, with Venstre constituting the green part.

In the last few election campaigns, Venstre's main focus has been on environmental issues, education, small-business and social issues. Venstre advocates higher taxes on activities that damage the environment. Some other issues Venstre advocate are increased labour immigration, abolition of the Church of Norway as the state church, abolishing the wealth and inheritance taxes, and more power to local authorities (kommuner).

At the national convention in 2005, Venstre decided with a margin of only five votes to still oppose Norway joining the European Union, albeit weakly, while still advocating that Norway remain part of the European Economic Area. In 2020, however, a majority at the national convention voted for Venstre to support EU membership for Norway. Thus, the official stance of Venstre is now in support of Norwegian membership of the European Union. Regardless, the party retains the position that the question of potential Norwegian EU membership should only be decided by a national referendum, similar to referendums held in 1972 and 1994. Venstre additionally supports the replacement of the monarchy with a republican form of government.

In 2007, Venstre became the first Norwegian party to advocate legalizing sharing of copyrighted digital material.

Etymology
While the name of the party means Left in Norwegian, the party refers to itself as a centrist party. Since the Centre Party was a component of the governing centre-left Red-Green Coalition, and Venstre was part of the "non-socialist" opposition, a situation has been produced where the centre party is more on the left than Left itself. When the name Left was chosen in 1884, the word did not refer to socialism in the way "Left wing" does today. It meant liberal or radicalism in comparison to the conservatives on the right, and referred to the position of the seats in Parliament. The use of the word for "left" in the names of the Danish political parties Venstre and Radikale Venstre is also meant to refer to liberalism and radicalism rather than socialism.

Party leaders 

 1884 Johan Sverdrup
 1884–1889 Ole Anton Qvam
 1889–1893 Johannes Steen
 1893–1894 Viggo Ullmann
 1894–1896 Ole Anton Qvam
 1898–1900 Viggo Ullmann
 1900–1903 Lars Holst
 1903–1909 Carl Berner
 1909–1927 Gunnar Knudsen
 1927–1940 Johan Ludwig Mowinckel
 1945–1952 Jacob S. Worm-Müller
 1952–1964 Bent Røiseland
 1964–1970 Gunnar Garbo
 1970–1972 Helge Seip
 1972–1974 Helge Rognlien
 1974–1976 Eva Kolstad
 1976–1982 Hans Hammond Rossbach
 1982–1986 Odd Einar Dørum
 1986–1990 Arne Fjørtoft
 1990–1992 Håvard Alstadheim
 1992–1996 Odd Einar Dørum
 1996–2010 Lars Sponheim
 2010–2020 Trine Skei Grande
 2020– Guri Melby

Prime ministers from Venstre 
 1884–1889 Johan Sverdrup
 1891–1893 Johannes Steen
 1898–1902 Johannes Steen
 1902–1903 Otto Blehr
 1907–1908 Jørgen Løvland
 1908–1910 Gunnar Knudsen
 1913–1920 Gunnar Knudsen
 1921–1923 Otto Blehr
 1924–1926 Johan Ludwig Mowinckel
 1928–1931 Johan Ludwig Mowinckel
 1933–1935 Johan Ludwig Mowinckel

Electoral results

See also 
 Liberalism
 Contributions to liberal theory
 Liberalism worldwide
 List of liberal parties
 Liberal democracy
 Liberalism in Norway

Notes

References

External links 
 Venstre official site  
 Election results for Venstre in the 2007 local elections

 
Liberal parties in Norway
Alliance of Liberals and Democrats for Europe Party member parties
Classical liberal parties
Green liberalism
Liberal International
Political parties established in 1884
Radical parties
Republicanism in Norway
Social liberal parties
1884 establishments in Norway